Millennium Records is a defunct record label run by record producer Jimmy Ienner from 1976 to 1983. During its RCA-distributed years, a significant portion of its output was content licensed from Canadian record labels.

Hits
The label's best-selling artist was electronic music pioneer Meco, whose disco cover of John Williams' "Star Wars Theme/Cantina Band" cues from Star Wars was a number 1 hit in 1977. In 1978, Meco followed up with two more movie-inspired hits for the label: a number 25 hit "Theme From Close Encounters" and a number 35 hit "Themes From The Wizard of Oz".

In 1981, Don McLean had three hits on the Millennium label: "Crying" which peaked at number 5; a number 23 song, "Since I Don't Have You" and a number 36 song, "Castles in the Air".

Between 1981 and 1982, the band Franke & the Knockouts had three top 100 hits on Millennium: "Sweetheart" at number 10, "You're My Girl" at number 27, and "Without You" at number 24.

Millennium is noteworthy for having passed on signing Madonna in 1981.

Artists

Brooklyn Dreams
Chilliwack
Daniel Conti
Johnny Destry
Bruce Foster
Bruce Cockburn
Franke & The Knockouts
The Godz
Tommy James
Lori Lieberman
Don McLean
Meco
Rose
Rodway
Joey Travolta
Yipes!

References

External links
 Millennium Records at Discogs

Casablanca Records
RCA Records
Hip hop record labels
Record labels based in California
Defunct record labels of the United States
Record labels established in 1977